Gretton Halt railway station was a halt opened by the Great Western Railway on the Honeybourne Line from  to Cheltenham which served the small village of Gretton in Gloucestershire between 1906 and 1960. The line through the site of the station was reinstated in 1997 by the Gloucestershire Warwickshire Railway, although no new halt was provided.

History 
The OW&W became the West Midland Railway in 1860 and was acquired by Great Western Railway in 1883 with a view to combining it with the Birmingham to Stratford Line to create a high-speed route from the Midlands to the South West. The GWR obtained authorisation in 1899 for the construction of a double-track line between Honeybourne and Cheltenham and this was completed in stages by 1908.

Gretton Halt was opened on 1 June 1906. The villagers had asked the Great Western Railway to provide a siding, but this was refused by its Traffic Committee on 28 February 1906. Instead, the construction of a halt was authorised at an estimated cost of £310. The station consisted of two facing -long wooden trellis platforms, on each of which was provided a pagoda passenger shelter. A  extension to the platforms was authorised in November 1906 at a cost of £30.

The timetable for August 1906 shows that Gretton Halt was served by seven weekday railmotor services each way between Honeybourne and St James. This figure had dropped to five by 1947, but rose to six by 1959. It was used by author and engineer L. T. C. Rolt who lived in nearby Stanley Pontlarge in the 1920s. Gretton Halt closed on 7 March 1960, the same day on which the local passenger service was withdrawn from the Honeybourne Line.

Present day
The Gloucestershire Warwickshire Railway have reopened the line through the site of Gretton Halt, with the first services between Winchcombe and  running in 1997.

The bridge adjacent to the site of Gretton Halt (bridge 26) underwent repairs in 2009 following a collision by a lorry.

References

Sources

 
 
 

 

Railway stations in Great Britain opened in 1906
Railway stations in Great Britain closed in 1960
Disused railway stations in Gloucestershire
Former Great Western Railway stations